Sea Wife is a 1957 British CinemaScope drama thriller war film photographed in DeLuxe Color, based on the 1955 James Maurice Scott novel Sea-Wyf and Biscuit. Shot in Jamaica, the film follows a group of survivors from a torpedoed British refugee ship.

Plot
Michael Cannon (Richard Burton) returns to London after the Second World War and places advertisements in the personal columns of various newspapers in an effort to re-unite with "Sea Wife", a lost acquaintance. Eventually Cannon, who publishes his adverts under the name "Biscuit", receives a letter summoning him to the Ely Retreat and Mental Home. There he meets an ill man nicknamed "Bulldog" (Basil Sydney), who tries to persuade Biscuit to give up the search. A flashback reveals the backstory.

In 1942, people crowd aboard a ship, the San Felix, to escape Singapore before it falls to the Japanese Army. Biscuit is brusquely shouldered aside by a determined older man, "Bulldog", who insists the ship's black purser, later to be nicknamed "Number Four" (Cy Grant), evict the people from the cabin he has reserved. However, when he sees that it is occupied by hungry children and nuns, he reluctantly changes his mind. The nun with her back to him is the beautiful young Sister Therese, later nicknamed "Sea Wife" (Joan Collins). Later, the San Felix is torpedoed by a submarine. Biscuit, Sea Wife, Bulldog, and Number Four survive by going into the water and occupying a small life-raft. Only Number Four knows that Sea Wife is a nun; she asks him to keep that a secret.

It soon becomes evident that Bulldog is a racist who does not trust Number Four. Later, they encounter a Japanese submarine whose captain at first refuses to offer them aid, but gives them food and water when Number Four negotiates with him in Japanese, though what he has said is kept a secret between himself and Sea Wife. Eventually, the quartet land on a deserted island. Number Four finds a machete, with which he builds a sturdier raft, made of tropical timber. After completion of the project, Number Four insists on keeping the machete to himself, which heightens Bulldog's distrust. Meanwhile, Biscuit falls in love with Sea Wife; she is tempted, but rejects his romantic advances without telling him the reason.

Finally, the four are ready to set sail. Bulldog tricks Number Four into going in search of his missing machete, then casts off without him. When Biscuit tries to stop him, Bulldog knocks him unconscious with an oar. Number Four tries to swim to the raft, but is killed by a shark. Days later, the 3 survivors are picked up by ship, and Biscuit is taken to a hospital for a long recovery. By the time he is discharged, Sea Wife has gone. Here, the flashback ends, and the narrative returns to "Bulldog's" hospital room in London, where he informs Biscuit that Sea Wife died on the rescue ship.  Heartbroken, Biscuit leaves the grounds and walks past two nuns without noticing that Sea Wife is one of them. She watches him leave in silence.

Production
Richard Burton accepted this acting assignment only because, at the time, Roberto Rossellini had been slotted by the Fox studio as the film's director. However, before actual shooting began in Jamaica, Rossellini, whose script would have invited censorship problems, bowed out of the production and was replaced by Bob McNaught.

Sensing early during shooting that the film would wind up a dud, Burton concentrated his energies on two objectives: Joan Collins, who rejected his advances, and drinking, to fight insomnia. Yet despite waking every morning at 5 am with a terrible hangover, he was still able to contribute a full day's work.

During initial exhibition of Sea Wife, The Daily Telegraph distributed miniaturized copies of the personal ads placed by "Biscuit" as a means of promoting itself as well as the film.

The deserted-island scenes for this movie were photographed at the same Ocho Rios, Jamaica, location that had previously been used in such pictures as Island of Desire (1953) and All the Brothers Were Valiant (1953). The city of Kingston stood in for Singapore during early scenes of the film; and before the episode involving the torpedoed ship was shot, Richard Burton participated in a cricket match with some of the actors and extras who were about to be used for that scene.

As noted by the New York Times, the opening credits for Sea Wife state that the film was "adapted from the novel 'Sea-Wyf' by J. M. Scott"—but the person or persons who did the adaptation is/are not identified.

Cast
 Joan Collins as Sea Wife
 Richard Burton as Biscuit
 Basil Sydney as Bulldog
 Cy Grant as Number Four
 Ronald Squire as Clubman
 Harold Goodwin as Daily Telegraph Clerk
 Roddy Hughes as Club Barman
 Gibb McLaughlin as Club Porter
 Lloyd Lamble as Captain 'San Felix'
 Ronald Adam as Army Padre
 Nicholas Hannen as Elderly Passenger
 Beatrice Varley as Elderly Nun

References

External links
 
 
 
 

1957 films
1957 romantic drama films
British romantic drama films
Films shot at Elstree Studios
Films about survivors of seafaring accidents or incidents
Films based on British novels
Films set on uninhabited islands
World War II naval films
Films with screenplays by Nigel Balchin
1950s English-language films
1950s British films